Čaglin is a village and a municipality in Slavonia, Croatia. The population of the municipality was 2122 in 2021.

References

Populated places in Požega-Slavonia County
Municipalities of Croatia